Sir Ludovic James Dunnett, GCB, CMG (12 February 1914 – 30 December 1997) was an English civil servant. Born in India, he was the son of Sir James Macdonald Dunnett, a senior official in the Indian Civil Service. He grew up in Edinburgh before attending University College, Oxford. He entered the civil service in 1936 as an official in the Air Ministry. From 1938 to 1945, he was private secretary to the Permanent Secretary. In 1945, he moved to the Ministry of Civil Aviation and later moved to the Ministry of Supply, where he was a deputy secretary. He was then Permanent Secretary of the Ministry of Transport (from 1959 to 1962), the Ministry of Labour (from 1962 to 1966) and the Ministry of Defence (from 1966 to 1972). In retirement, he was chairman of the International Maritime Industries Forum from 1976 to 1979, and president of the Institute of Manpower Studies from 1977 yo 1988. His second wife was the Hungarian-born artist Clarisse, née Feher. She was the widow of Grantley Loxton-Peacock and the insurance executive Sir Anthony Charles Grover, and the maternal grandmother (by her first marriage) of George Osborne. His brother was the diplomat Denzil Dunnett (1917–2016).

References 

1914 births
1997 deaths
British civil servants
Alumni of University College, Oxford
Knights Grand Cross of the Order of the Bath
Companions of the Order of St Michael and St George
British people in colonial India